Ben Donnell (born 2 August 2000) is an English rugby union player who plays for London Irish in the Premiership Rugby.

References

External links
London Irish Profile
ESPN Profile
Ultimate Rugby Profile

2000 births
Living people
English rugby union players
London Irish players
Rugby union players from Winchester
Rugby union flankers